In the Senedd, the Leader of the Opposition (officially the Leader of the Opposition in the Senedd) is the leader of the largest political party in the Senedd that is not part of government and provides the official opposition to the government. Since 7 May 2021 the Leader of the Opposition in the Senedd is Andrew RT Davies (Conservative). To date the office has been held by six individuals, three from Plaid Cymru and three from the Welsh Conservatives. Only one, Ieuan Wyn Jones, has gone on to serve in the Welsh Government.

History
Between July 2007 and May 2011, Nick Bourne served as Leader of the Opposition, even though the Conservatives were the third largest group in the Assembly. This was a result of the Welsh Government's make-up consisting of Labour and Plaid Cymru, which were the largest and second largest groups respectively.

Following the 2016 election, Plaid Cymru (led by Leanne Wood) became the largest group not in government, having won 12 seats to the Welsh Conservatives' 11. On 14 October 2016 Dafydd Elis-Thomas left Plaid Cymru to sit as an independent, which resulted in Plaid Cymru and the Welsh Conservatives both holding 11 seats. During this period Leanne Wood was not referred to as Leader of the Opposition but was instead referred to as the leader of Plaid Cymru. The Conservative group grew to 12 following Mark Reckless's defection from UKIP to the Conservative Group on 6 April 2017, and Andrew RT Davies was once again referred to as Leader of the Opposition.

On 29 March 2021 Nick Ramsay left the Welsh Conservative party, meaning that the group had lost its title as the largest party not in government as by this point both the Welsh Conservatives and Plaid Cymru were tied on 10 seats each, with no official office holder of the Leader of the opposition in the final period before the 2021 Senedd election.

Following the 2021 Senedd election the Welsh Conservatives returned 16 seats making them comfortably the second party ahead of Plaid Cymru who won 13 and as a result Andrew RT Davies once again became Leader of the Opposition.

List of leaders of the opposition in the Senedd

See also
 Welsh Shadow Cabinet
First Minister of Wales
 Deputy First Minister for Wales
 Welsh Government

References

Senedd
Wales